Viktor Ivanovich Varlamov ; born 28 April 1948 in Petropavl) is a former Soviet speedskater.

He competed at the 1976 Winter Olympics, where he placed fourth in both 5,000 and 10,000 metres.

World records 
He set during his career one world record.

Source: SpeedSkatingStats.com

References

External links

1948 births
Living people
People from Petropavl
Kazakhstani male speed skaters
Soviet male speed skaters
World record setters in speed skating
Olympic speed skaters of the Soviet Union
Speed skaters at the 1976 Winter Olympics
Kazakhstani people of Russian descent